115 (also known as Barge 115, No.115, or Whaleback 115) was an American whaleback barge in service between 1891 and 1899. She was built between May and August 1891, in Superior, Wisconsin (or West Superior, Wisconsin) by Alexander McDougall's American Steel Barge Company, for the "McDougall fleet", based in Buffalo, New York. She was one of a class of distinctive, experimental ship designed and built by McDougall. The whalebacks were designed to be more stable in high seas. They had rounded decks, and lacked the normal straight sides seen on traditional lake freighters. 115 entered service on August 25, hauling iron ore from Superior.

In December 1899, while being towed by the whaleback freighter Colgate Hoyt from Two Harbors, Minnesota, for Lake Erie with a load of iron ore, the two vessels encountered a storm. After 40 hours of slow progress across Lake Superior, 115 broke away from Colgate Hoyt at 6:05a.m., on December 13. Colgate Hoyt searched for her for four hours, but due to the scarcity of fuel on board, she was forced to proceed to Sault Ste. Marie. After drifting around Lake Superior for five days, 115 crashed into Pic Island, near Marathon, Ontario. Her crew made it to shore in a makeshift raft, walking for several days, before being located by crew from the Canadian Pacific Railway.

History

Background

115 was a whaleback, an innovative but unpopular ship design of the late 1880s, designed by Alexander McDougall. A Scottish immigrant, Great Lakes captain, inventor and entrepreneur, McDougall developed the idea of the whaleback as a way to improve the ability of barges to follow a towing vessel in heavy seas. Whalebacks were characterized by distinctive hull shapes with rounded tops, lacking conventional vertical sides, and conoidal ends. Their rounded hulls enabled water to easily slide off their decks, minimising friction, and letting them sail quickly and smoothly through the water. Their superstructure was located on turrets mounted on the main deck. The rounded contours of whalebacks gave them an unconventional appearance, and McDougall's ship and barge designs were received with considerable skepticism, resistance, and derision. As they had porcine-looking snouts for bows, some observers called them "pig boats".

After McDougall was unable to persuade existing shipbuilders to try his designs, he founded the American Steel Barge Company in Superior, Wisconsin, in 1888, and built them himself. McDougall actively promoted his design and company by sending the steamer Charles W. Wetmore to London, and starting another shipyard in Everett, Washington, which built the steamer City of Everett. Despite McDougall's further efforts to promote the design with the excursion liner Christopher Columbus, whalebacks never caught on, with only 44 of them being built.

Design and construction
115 (also known as Barge 115, No.115, or Whaleback 115) was constructed in 1891, in Superior (or West Superior), Wisconsin, by the American Steel Barge Company. Her first hull frames were laid down on May 21, 1891. She was launched on August 15, of that same year. 115 was identical to the barge 116, launched later in August. She had a gross tonnage of 1,169 tons, and a net tonnage of 1,110 tons. She was an unrigged barge, and was towed by a steam-powered ship.

Service history
115 was built by the American Steel Barge Company for the fleet of the same name based in Buffalo, New York. She was enrolled in Duluth, Minnesota, on August 20, 1891, and was given the US official number 53268. Her home port was Buffalo. 115 entered service on August 25, carrying iron ore from Superior, Wisconsin.

On May 11 or 12, 1893, 115 was in tow of Colgate Hoyt, when she was struck by the downbound whaleback freighter Thomas Wilson, which had the whaleback barge 101 in tow. 115 was dry docked in Duluth on May 20, for repairs. 115 broke 16 hull plates on May 3, 1894, when she collided with the steamer Mesaba on Lake George. In 1895, management of the American Steel Barge Company fleet was taken over by Pickands Mather & Company of Cleveland, Ohio. While loaded with iron ore and under tow of the whaleback steamer A.D. Thompson, 115 ran aground in the St. Marys River, below the Sault Ste. Marie Canal in the afternoon on July 18, 1897. She was released on the morning of July 19, after lightering her cargo, which she later reloaded; she sustained no damage in the grounding. In August 1897, 115 was dry docked in West Superior, in order to repair damage she sustained after striking the bottom in an unknown river. Ten of her bottom plates and two of her keel plates needed to be replaced.

Final voyage
In December 1899, 115 and her towing steamer Colgate Hoyt were in Two Harbors, Minnesota, where 115 loaded 3,000 tons of iron ore bound for Lake Erie, on what was meant to be their final trip of the shipping season. The two vessels left Two Harbors on December 10, and headed for the Soo Locks. 115 was under the command of Arthur A. Boyce, and had a complement of eight crew (including Captain Boyce). As the two vessels left Two Harbors, they sailed into a storm. For 40 hours, Colgate Hoyt and 115 made slow progress across Lake Superior, when at 6:05a.m. on December 13, 115 broke away from Colgate Hoyt, south of Pic Island. Colgate Hoyts crew frantically searched for 115 for four hours, but scarcity of fuel on board forced her to proceed to Sault Ste. Marie, where they enlisted tugboats to help search for 115. Initially, 115 and her crew were believed to have been lost.

115 drifted for five days before stranding near Marathon, Ontario, on Pic Island, located on the north shore of Lake Superior, becoming the final shipwreck to occur on the Great Lakes during the 1800s. Her crew made it ashore in 115s small life raft, making multiple trips between the stranded barge and Pic Island until everyone on board reached safety. Some of the crewmen carried with them extra clothes, while others carried food (two loaves of bread and ham). As well as clothes and the food items, the crewmen carried with them candles and grease. After walking around the island for a while, the crewmen discovered an old, roofless log cabin, containing a stove. They fashioned a roof out of tree branches, and spent the night in the cabin. The following morning, the crewmen tore the cabin down, fashioning a makeshift raft out of the wood. They made it ashore on the mainland, and ended up camping in the bush. The next day, they began walking along the shore to the west, camping in the bush that night as well. After walking for four days, the crewmen stumbled upon a Canadian Pacific Railway track. Following the track, the crewmen managed to make it to Middletown, Ontario, at around noon, that same day. Although all of 115s crew survived, her cook's feet were frostbitten. All of 115s crew made it home in time for Christmas. 115 was the second whaleback lost on the Great Lakes.

115 wreck
Maritime historian and author Cris Kohl's book, The 100 Best Great Lakes Shipwrecks – Volume II. erroneously states that 115s bow with its turret is intact, whereas dive footage shot in about 1980 shows that her stern and its turret are intact, instead of the bow. The bow section is broken up. Her intact bell was retrieved around the time she was discovered.

Notes

References

Sources

 
 
 
 
 
 
 
 
 
  Google books has images of those pages in the chapter entitled  The Turret Steamship 
 
 
 
 
 
 
 
 
 
 
 
 
 
 
 
 
 

1891 ships
Ships built in Superior, Wisconsin
Maritime incidents in 1893
Maritime incidents in 1894
Maritime incidents in 1899
Whaleback ships
Shipwrecks of Lake Superior
Merchant ships of the United States
1980 archaeological discoveries
Shipwrecks of the Ontario coast
Wreck diving sites
Ships sunk in storms